In differential geometry, the notion of torsion is a manner of characterizing a twist or screw of a moving frame around a curve.  The torsion of a curve, as it appears in the Frenet–Serret formulas, for instance, quantifies the twist of a curve about its tangent vector as the curve evolves (or rather the rotation of the Frenet–Serret frame about the tangent vector). In the geometry of surfaces, the  geodesic torsion describes how a surface twists about a curve on the surface. The companion notion of  curvature measures how moving frames "roll" along a curve "without twisting".

More generally, on a differentiable manifold equipped with an affine connection (that is, a connection in the tangent bundle), torsion and curvature form the two fundamental invariants of the connection. In this context, torsion gives an intrinsic characterization of how  tangent spaces twist about a curve when they are parallel transported; whereas curvature describes how the tangent spaces roll along the curve. Torsion may be described concretely as a  tensor, or as a vector-valued 2-form on the manifold. If ∇ is an affine connection on a  differential manifold, then the torsion tensor is defined, in terms of vector fields X and Y, by

where [X,Y] is the Lie bracket of vector fields.

Torsion is particularly useful in the study of the geometry of geodesics. Given a system of parametrized geodesics, one can specify a class of affine connections having those geodesics, but differing by their torsions. There is a unique connection which absorbs the torsion, generalizing the Levi-Civita connection to other, possibly non-metric situations (such as Finsler geometry). The difference between a connection with torsion, and a corresponding connection without torsion is a tensor, called the contorsion tensor. Absorption of torsion also plays a fundamental role in the study of  G-structures and Cartan's equivalence method. Torsion is also useful in the study of unparametrized families of geodesics, via the associated projective connection. In relativity theory, such ideas have been implemented in the form of Einstein–Cartan theory.

The torsion tensor
Let M be a manifold with an affine connection on the tangent bundle (aka covariant derivative) ∇. The  torsion tensor (sometimes called the Cartan (torsion) tensor) of  ∇ is the vector-valued 2-form defined on vector fields X and Y by

where  is the Lie bracket of two vector fields. By the  Leibniz rule, T(fX, Y) = T(X, fY) = fT(X, Y) for any smooth function f. So  T is tensorial, despite being defined in terms of the connection  which is a first order differential operator: it gives a 2-form on tangent vectors, while the covariant derivative is only defined for vector fields.

Components of the torsion tensor
The components of the torsion tensor  in terms of a local basis  of sections of the tangent bundle can be derived by setting ,  and by introducing the commutator coefficients .  The components of the torsion are then

Here  are the connection coefficients defining the connection. If the basis is holonomic then the Lie brackets vanish, .   So . In particular (see below), while the geodesic equations determine the symmetric part of the connection, the torsion tensor determines the antisymmetric part.

The torsion form
The torsion form, an alternative characterization of torsion, applies to the frame bundle FM of the manifold M. This  principal bundle is equipped with a connection form ω, a gl(n)-valued one-form which maps vertical vectors to the generators of the right action in gl(n) and equivariantly intertwines the right action of GL(n) on the tangent bundle of FM with the adjoint representation on gl(n). The frame bundle also carries a canonical one-form θ, with values in Rn, defined at a frame  (regarded as a linear function ) by

The torsion form is then

Equivalently, Θ = Dθ, where D is the exterior covariant derivative determined by the connection.

The torsion form is a (horizontal) tensorial form with values in Rn, meaning that under the right action of  it transforms equivariantly:

where g acts on the right-hand side through its adjoint representation on Rn.

Torsion form in a frame

The torsion form may be expressed in terms of a connection form on the base manifold M, written in a particular frame of the tangent bundle . The connection form expresses the exterior covariant derivative of these basic sections:

The solder form for the tangent bundle (relative to this frame) is the dual basis  of the ei, so that  (the Kronecker delta).  Then the torsion 2-form has components

In the rightmost expression,

are the frame-components of the torsion tensor, as given in the previous definition.

It can be easily shown that Θi transforms tensorially in the sense that if a different frame

for some invertible matrix-valued function (gji), then

In other terms, Θ is a tensor of type  (carrying one contravariant and two covariant indices).

Alternatively, the solder form can be characterized in a frame-independent fashion as the TM-valued one-form θ on M corresponding to the identity endomorphism of the tangent bundle under the duality isomorphism . Then the torsion 2-form is a section

given by

where D is the exterior covariant derivative. (See  connection form for further details.)

Irreducible decomposition
The torsion tensor can be decomposed into two irreducible parts: a trace-free part and another part which contains the trace terms. Using the index notation, the trace of T is given by

and the trace-free part is

where δij is the Kronecker delta.

Intrinsically, one has

The trace of T, tr T, is an element of T∗M defined as follows. For each vector fixed , T defines an element T(X) of  via

Then (tr T)(X) is defined as the trace of this endomorphism. That is,

The trace-free part of T is then

where ι denotes the interior product.

Curvature and the Bianchi identities
The curvature tensor of ∇ is a mapping  defined on vector fields X, Y, and Z by

For vectors at a point, this definition is independent of how the vectors are extended to vector fields away from the point (thus it defines a tensor, much like the torsion).

The Bianchi identities relate the curvature and torsion as follows. Let  denote the cyclic sum over X, Y, and Z.  For instance,

Then the following identities hold

 Bianchi's first identity: 
 
 Bianchi's second identity:

The curvature form and Bianchi identities
The curvature form is the gl(n)-valued 2-form

where, again, D denotes the exterior covariant derivative.  In terms of the curvature form and torsion form, the corresponding Bianchi identities are
 
 

Moreover, one can recover the curvature and torsion tensors from the curvature and torsion forms as follows. At a point u of FxM, one has

where again  is the function specifying the frame in the fibre, and the choice of lift of the vectors via π−1 is irrelevant since the curvature and torsion forms are horizontal (they vanish on the ambiguous vertical vectors).

Characterizations and interpretations
Throughout this section, M is assumed to be a differentiable manifold, and ∇ a covariant derivative on the tangent bundle of M unless otherwise noted.

Twisting of reference frames
In the classical differential geometry of curves, the Frenet-Serret formulas describe how a particular moving frame (the Frenet-Serret frame) twists along a curve. In physical terms, the torsion corresponds to the  angular momentum of an idealized top pointing along the tangent of the curve.

The case of a manifold with a (metric) connection admits an analogous interpretation. Suppose that an observer is moving along a geodesic for the connection. Such an observer is ordinarily thought of as inertial since they experience no acceleration. Suppose that in addition the observer carries with themselves a system of rigid straight measuring rods (a  coordinate system). Each rod is a straight segment; a  geodesic. Assume that each rod is  parallel transported along the trajectory. The fact that these rods are physically  carried along the trajectory means that they are Lie-dragged, or propagated so that the Lie derivative of each rod along the tangent vanishes. They may, however, experience torque (or torsional forces) analogous to the torque felt by the top in the Frenet-Serret frame. This force is measured by the torsion.

More precisely, suppose that the observer moves along a geodesic path γ(t) and carries a measuring rod along it. The rod sweeps out a surface as the observer travels along the path. There are natural coordinates  along this surface, where t is the parameter time taken by the observer, and x is the position along the measuring rod. The condition that the tangent of the rod should be parallel translated along the curve is

Consequently, the torsion is given by

If this is not zero, then the marked points on the rod (the  curves) will trace out helices instead of geodesics. They will tend to rotate around the observer. Note that for this argument it was not essential that   is a geodesic. Any curve would work.

This interpretation of torsion plays a role in the theory of teleparallelism, also known as Einstein–Cartan theory, an alternative formulation of relativity theory.

The torsion of a filament
In materials science, and especially elasticity theory, ideas of torsion also play an important role. One problem models the growth of vines, focusing on the question of how vines manage to twist around objects. The vine itself is modeled as a pair of elastic filaments twisted around one another. In its energy-minimizing state, the vine naturally grows in the shape of a helix. But the vine may also be stretched out to maximize its extent (or length). In this case, the torsion of the vine is related to the torsion of the pair of filaments (or equivalently the surface torsion of the ribbon connecting the filaments), and it reflects the difference between the length-maximizing (geodesic) configuration of the vine and its energy-minimizing configuration.

Torsion and vorticity
In fluid dynamics, torsion is naturally associated to vortex lines.

Geodesics and the absorption of torsion
Suppose that γ(t) is a curve on M.  Then γ is an affinely parametrized geodesic provided that

for all time t in the domain of γ. (Here the dot denotes differentiation with respect to  t, which associates with γ the tangent vector pointing along it.) Each geodesic is uniquely determined by its initial tangent vector at time , .

One application of the torsion of a connection involves the geodesic spray of the connection: roughly the family of all affinely parametrized geodesics. Torsion is the ambiguity of classifying connections in terms of their geodesic sprays:
 Two connections ∇ and ∇′ which have the same affinely parametrized geodesics (i.e., the same geodesic spray) differ only by torsion.

be the difference of the two connections, calculated in terms of arbitrary extensions of X and Y away from p. By the Leibniz product rule, one sees that Δ does not actually depend on how X and Y are extended (so it defines a tensor on M). Let  S and A be the symmetric and alternating parts of Δ:

Then
  is the difference of the torsion tensors.
 ∇ and ∇′ define the same families of affinely parametrized geodesics if and only if .
In other words, the symmetric part of the difference of two connections determines whether they have the same parametrized geodesics, whereas the skew part of the difference is determined by the relative torsions of the two connections.  Another consequence is:
 Given any affine connection ∇, there is a unique torsion-free connection ∇′ with the same family of affinely parametrized geodesics. The difference between these two connections is in fact a tensor, the contorsion tensor.
This is a generalization of the fundamental theorem of Riemannian geometry to general affine (possibly non-metric) connections. Picking out the unique torsion-free connection subordinate to a family of parametrized geodesics is known as  absorption of torsion, and it is one of the stages of Cartan's equivalence method.

See also
Contorsion tensor
Curtright field
Curvature tensor
Levi-Civita connection
Torsion coefficient
Torsion of curves

Notes

References
 
 
 
 
 
 , 393.
 , 212.
 
 
 
 
 
 

Differential geometry
Connection (mathematics)
Curvature (mathematics)
Tensors